= Magdalenenfest =

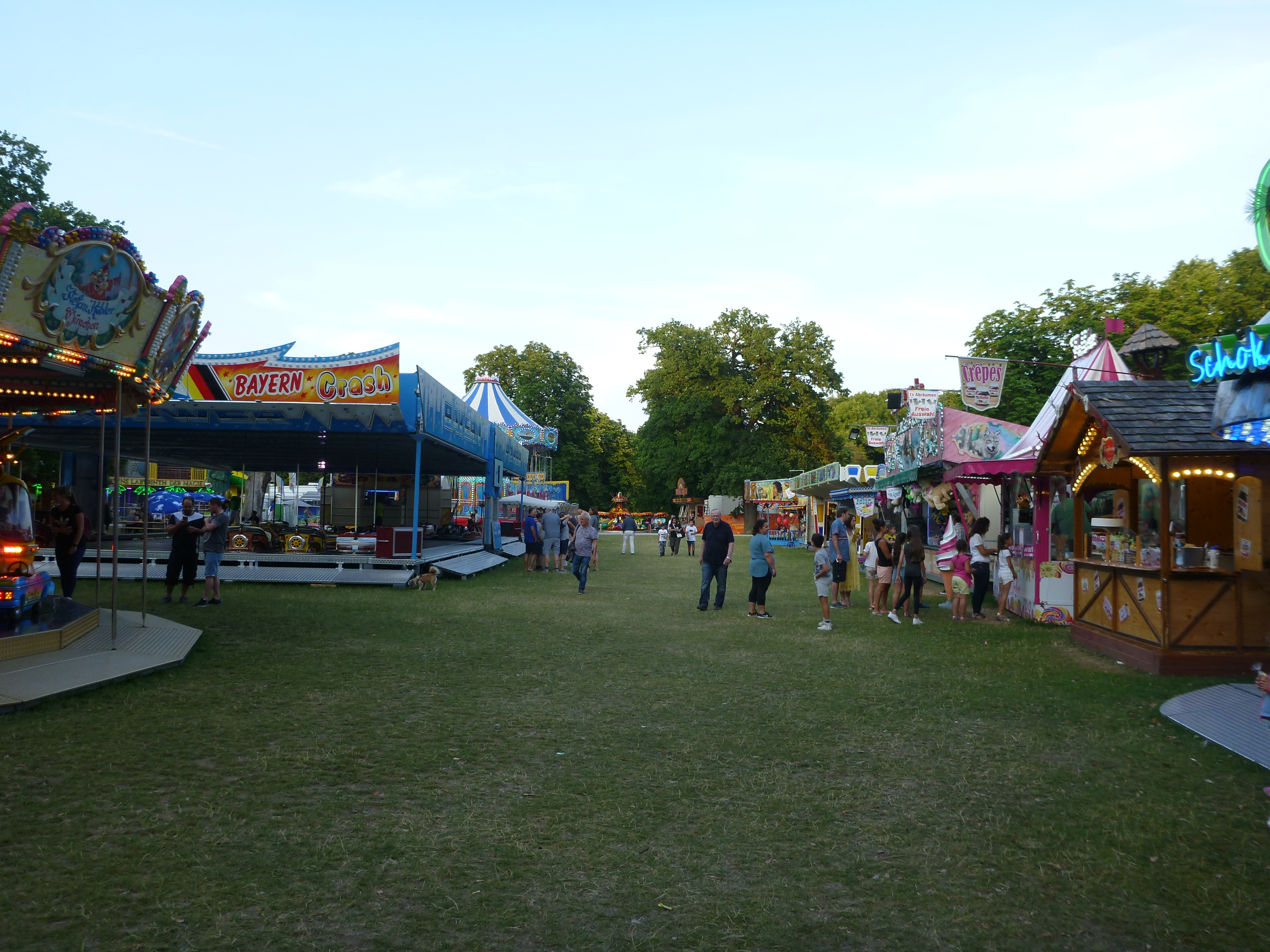
The Magdalenenfest in 2019

The Magdalenenfest is an annual end of summer 16-day festival in the Munich Hirschgarten. It is named after Mary Magdalene.

The Fest dates back to the year 1728, the year that Magdalenenklause opened in Schlosspark Nymphenburg (palace garden). On the patron saint's name day, 22 July, the Schlosspark and the Magdalenenklause were made available to the common people. One notable feature at the Magdalenenklause was a small spring, which was believed to help with eye diseases. The Magdalenenklause turned into a place of pilgrimage. In 1790, the Schlosspark was opened permanently for the general public and a carnival around the name day was developed, the Magalenefest. The Magdalenenfest took place in the Schlosspark until 1930, when it was moved to the Romanplatz, and later moved to the Hirschgarten in 1958.
